Saint Cajetan is a Roman Catholic church of the Polish era in Râşcov, northern Transnistria a disputed territory with Moldova, which has recently undergone extensive renovation and which the PMR government considers a historical heritage location. The church was built in the 16th century, when northern Transnistria was a part of the Crown of the Polish Kingdom.

References

16th-century Roman Catholic church buildings
Roman Catholic churches in Moldova
Roman Catholic churches in Transnistria